Interleukin 22 receptor, alpha 1 is a protein that in humans is encoded by the IL22RA1 gene.

Function 

The protein encoded by this gene belongs to the class II cytokine receptor family, and has been shown to be a receptor for interleukin 22 (IL22). IL22 receptor is a protein complex that consists of this protein and interleukin 10 receptor, beta (IL10RB/CRFB4), a subunit also shared by the receptor complex for interleukin 10 (IL10). This gene and interleukin 28 receptor, alpha (IL28RA) form a cytokine receptor gene cluster in the chromosomal region 1p36.

References

Further reading 

 
 
 
 
 
 
 
 
 

Type II cytokine receptors